is a Japanese sprinter and triple jumper. He competed in the triple jump at the 1956 Summer Olympics and in the triple jump and the men's 4 × 100 metres relay at the 1960 Summer Olympics. After retiring, he has held a number of senior positions in athletics-related organisations, such as the Japan Association of Athletics Federations.

References

External links
 

1935 births
Living people
Place of birth missing (living people)
Japanese male sprinters
Japanese male long jumpers
Japanese male triple jumpers
Olympic male sprinters
Olympic male long jumpers
Olympic male triple jumpers
Olympic athletes of Japan
Athletes (track and field) at the 1956 Summer Olympics
Athletes (track and field) at the 1960 Summer Olympics
Universiade bronze medalists for Japan
Universiade medalists in athletics (track and field)
Medalists at the 1959 Summer Universiade
Japan Championships in Athletics winners
20th-century Japanese people